Braden "Brad" Houston is a Canadian retired ice hockey and golf coach. Houston served as the head coach for Colgate University's ice hockey team for 3 years and its golf program for 28 before retiring in 2005.

Head coaching record

References

External links

Living people
Canadian ice hockey defencemen
Colgate Raiders men's ice hockey coaches
New Hampshire Wildcats men's ice hockey players
Sportspeople from Scarborough, Toronto
Ice hockey people from Toronto
Year of birth missing (living people)